Kyriakos "Kyt" Selaidopoulos (born February 26, 1978) is a Canadian soccer and futsal coach who serves as an assistant coach of Forge FC and head coach of the Canadian national futsal team.

As a player, he played in the USISL D-3 Pro League, National Professional Soccer League, USL A-League, Canadian Professional Soccer League, and the Major Indoor Soccer League.

Playing career 
Selaidopoulos began his career in 1995 in the National Professional Soccer League with the Chicago Power. In his debut season in the NPSL he appeared in four matches and recorded one goal. After the conclusion of the indoor season he signed with the Vermont Voltage of the USISL D-3 Pro League in 1997. In 1999, he signed with the Montreal Impact and played during the 1999–2000 indoor season where he appeared in 33 matches and scored five goals. He featured in the 2000 outdoor season, but after suffering a groin injury he only featured in five matches and soon after was released from his contract. In 2001, he signed with newly expansion franchise the Montreal Dynamites of the Canadian Professional Soccer League. With the Dynamites he led his team to a fourth-place finish in the overall standings, thus qualifying for the playoffs. In the playoffs the Dynamites faced St. Catharines Wolves, but were defeated by a score of 2–1 with the lone goal coming from Selaidopolous.

On April 14, 2004 he returned to Montreal Impact. During the 2004 season he assisted in the tream's record 12-game undefeated streak, and won the A-League title, the club's second North American Championship in team history. He returned to indoor soccer by signing with the Cleveland Force of the Major Indoor Soccer League in the winter of 2004. He had further stints with Milwaukee Wave, and the Detroit Ignition.

Coaching career
In 2016, Selaidopoulos became head coach of the Canada national futsal team. On March 15, 2021, he was named an assistant coach of Canadian Premier League side Forge FC

Honours
Montreal Impact
 A-League/USL: 2004
 Voyageurs Cup: 2004

References

External links

1978 births
Living people
Canadian people of Greek descent
Canadian Soccer League (1998–present) players
Canadian soccer players
Chicago Power players
Cleveland Force (2002–2005 MISL) players
Detroit Ignition (MISL) players
Laval Dynamites players
Milwaukee Wave players
Major Indoor Soccer League (2001–2008) players
Montreal Impact (1992–2011) players
National Professional Soccer League (1984–2001) players
Soccer players from Montreal
USL Second Division players
A-League (1995–2004) players
Vermont Voltage players
Association football midfielders
Futsal coaches
Forge FC non-playing staff